Maria del Mar del Castillo is a Canadian television actress.

Biography
Maria del Mar played in recurring roles on series like Street Legal, TekWar, Mercy Point, Relativity, Blue Murder, Terminal City and Murdoch Mysteries.

She was married to screenwriter Guy Mullally, who met on the set of Street Legal. The marriage had two children, a girl named Paloma and a boy named Gabriel.

Her performance in A Touch of Grey (2009) earned her a Canadian Comedy Award in the 13th ceremony for the best female performance in a feature and nominated in 2001 to Gemini Award in the 16th edition for best performance by an actress in a continuing leading dramatic role for Blue Murder.

Filmography

Awards and nominations

Gemini Awards

ACTRA Toronto Awards

Canadian Comedy Awards

References

External links
 
 

Living people
Actresses from Madrid
Canadian television actresses
Canadian film actresses
Canadian voice actresses
Actresses from Ottawa
Year of birth missing (living people)
Canadian Comedy Award winners
Spanish emigrants to Canada